The Abu Ali Mustapha Brigades is the armed wing of the Popular Front for the Liberation of Palestine (PFLP) in the Palestinian territories (the West Bank, Gaza and East Jerusalem).

History 
Originally named the Red Eagles Brigades, they were renamed in 2001 after Abu Ali Mustafa, PFLP's leader, who was killed by Israel in August 2001. They were active with attacks on both military and civilian Israeli targets during the al-Aqsa Intifada.

On 16 July 2007, Palestinian president Mahmoud Abbas requested that all Palestinian resistance groups relinquish their weapons to the Palestinian Authority. Although several members of Fatah's armed wing Al-Aqsa Martyrs' Brigades complied, the Abu Ali Mustapha Brigades rejected this, stating that they will not cease their resistance until the Israelis withdraw from all parts of the West Bank and the Gaza Strip.

The Abu Ali Mustapha Brigades fought in the 2021 Israel–Palestine crisis.

Attacks carried out by the Brigades

The PFLP's Abu Ali Mustapha Brigades has carried out attacks on both civilians and military targets during the Al-Aqsa Intifada. Some of these attacks are:

 The killing of Meir Lixenberg, councilor and head of security in four settlements, who was shot while traveling in his car in the West Bank on 27 August 2001.
 The 17 October 2001 assassination of right-wing Israeli politician and Israeli Minister for Tourism Rehavam Zeevi, the only Israeli politician to have been assassinated in the Al-Aqsa Intifada.
 A suicide bombing in a pizzeria in Karnei Shomron in the West Bank, on 16 February 2002, killing three Israelis.
 A suicide bombing in Ariel on 7 March 2002, which left wounded but no fatalities.
 A suicide bombing in a Netanya market in Israel, on 19 May 2002, killing three Israelis. This attack was also claimed by Hamas, but the Abu Ali Mustafa Brigades have identified the perpetrator on their website as one of their members.
 A suicide bombing in the bus station at Geha Junction in Petah Tikva on 25 December 2003 which killed 4 Israelis.
 A suicide bombing in Bik'at HaYarden Regional Council on 22 May 2004, which left no fatalities.
 A suicide bombing in the Carmel Market in Tel Aviv on 1 November 2004, which killed 3 Israelis.
 The killing of four Israelis and another eight injured at a synagogue in West Jerusalem on 18 November 2014.
 A rocket attack which struck Sha'ar HaNegev, on 26 June 2017, caused no injuries or damage.

Foreign support 
The PFLP, and by extension the Abu Ali Mustapha Brigades, receive military and financial support by Iran. This relationship probably began around 2013, and although the actual extent of this support is unclear, the PFLP and Abu Ali Mustapha Brigades have repeatedly declared themselves allies of Iran and the Axis of Resistance.

See also 
 Democratic Front for the Liberation of Palestine
 Revolutionary People's Liberation Party/Front
 Syrian Resistance

References

1967 establishments in the Israeli Military Governorate
Arab nationalism in the Palestinian territories
Arab nationalist militant groups
Communism in the Palestinian territories
Marxist parties in Palestine
Military wings of communist parties
Military wings of nationalist parties
One-state solution
Palestinian militant groups
Popular Front for the Liberation of Palestine
Secularism in the State of Palestine